Wildfire is an American television series that aired on ABC Family from June 2005 to May 2008. The show was produced by Lionsgate Television, Piller², and The Segan Company (Michael Piller would later merge Piller² and The Segan Company into Piller/Segan to produce Greek). The show premiered on June 20, 2005; its fourth and final season ended on May 16, 2008, due to low ratings. Season one averaged just over a million weekly viewers and season two increased to 1.56 million, an increase of over 50%. Season three dropped back to the first year's numbers. The theme song is "Morning Light" sung by Truman.

Plot
Wildfire follows troubled Kris Furillo who, after serving time at a teen detention center, is given the opportunity to start a new life. Her talent with horses is recognized by a volunteer and local trainer Pablo, who arranges a job for her at the Ritter's family-run ranch, Raintree. Thrown into a completely new environment, Kris must learn to deal with the challenges of fitting in, and forming fiery relationships, while trying not to disappoint the one family willing to give her a chance. The Ritters are facing challenges of their own even as they reach out to help Kris. Patriarch Henry Ritter and his daughter Jean are in a critical stage of their battle to save the ranch from financial ruin. Kris and Wildfire must help them get back on the map in the world of horse racing.

Characters
Kristine "Kris" Furillo-Davis (Genevieve Cortese) A jockey who previously served time at Camp LaGrange, a correctional facility, for grand theft auto. She shares a special bond with Wildfire, a horse she saved from going to slaughter and helped turn into a champion racehorse. At one point, she was involved with her agent, Kerry Connelly, until he slept with Gillian, his ex-girlfriend. Kris spent most of the show in an on-and-off relationship with Junior Davis, until she pursued a brief but passionate fling with Matt Ritter in Season 3. She then proceeded to marry Junior in the series finale.
Matthew "Matt" Ritter (Micah Alberti) The son of Jean and Pete Ritter and the older brother of Todd Ritter. In Season 3 he becomes the co-owner of Raintree Farm along with his mother, inheriting his half of the farm's ownership when his grandfather (Jean's father), Henry Ritter, died. Early on, Matt wanted nothing to do with the "family business" of horses and racing, but came to discover he had a talent for training and conditioning Thoroughbreds and eventually took over as Raintree's head trainer.
Kenneth "Junior" Walter Davis Jr. (Ryan Sypek) The son of Ken Davis and Isabelle Matiya Ferris, and older half-brother to Dani. A very indecisive young man, he has gotten into gambling, owned a night club (which he lost in a bet with his former bookie, Bobby), dabbled in the sport of professional bull riding, and been involved on and off in the running of Davis Farms throughout the series. At one point he sold most of his shares of the farm and regretted it. Even though Junior tries his hardest to break away from the "rich kid" stereotype, he loves his Porsche convertible. Junior spent most of the series in an on-again, off-again relationship with Kris, eventually marrying her in the series finale.
Danielle "Dani" Davis (Nicole Tubiola) Daughter of Ken Davis and an unseen woman named Marisol deEsquvala, and younger half-sister of Junior. Dani started off being openly snobby, promiscuous, and catty but later became more likeable. She took over the running of Davis Farms after her father was indicted on fraud charges but signed her shares of the farm over to Junior after losing her racing license at the end of season three. In Season 4 she also runs her own veterinary clinic.
Kenneth "Ken" Walter Davis Sr. (James Read) Father of Junior and Dani. He ran Davis Farms until being indicted on six counts of fraud, which forced him to leave Davis Farms and his assets to his children and, in a series of events, caused him to lose his role as majority shareholder to Dani. After being acquitted of all the charges, Ken bought back 46% of Davis Farms. Out of all the romantic relationships that Junior and Dani ever had, the only one that Ken did not hate was Junior's relationship with Laura Nichols, the daughter of a congressman.
Jean Ritter (Nana Visitor) Matt and Todd's mother and the co-owner of Raintree Farm. Jean is reluctant to let Kris work at Raintree at first, but eventually grows to think of her as a daughter; in season three she often bumped heads with Kris and her son, Matt, over Wildfire's training and how Raintree should be run.
Pablo Betart (Greg Serano) An ex-convict and respected horseman. Pablo discovered Kris's talent for horses and riding while working as a volunteer trainer at Camp LaGrange and brought her to work for the Ritters. He is co-owner of Wildfire with Jean Ritter and her son, Matt, and Raintree's head trainer for most of the series.
Henry Ritter (Dennis Weaver) Henry is Jean's father, Todd's and Matt's grandfather and Pete's former father-in-law. At the beginning of the series he is shown to be a very quick-spoken, warm person. He dislikes his daughter's relationship with Ken Davis and does not like his children Dani or Junior either. He also shows that he likes Kris and helps her out as often as he can. He confronts Matt about his gambling and forces him to tell his mother, both of whom are furious with Matt. Shortly after, he disappears from the show and later in the series is mentioned dead, probably due to the 2006 passing away of Weaver, leaving a will handing over half of Raintree to Jean and the other half to Matt after he 'figures' out an Andalusian horse which he also left in his will for Matt.
Tina Sharp (Amy Jo Johnson) A hotshot jockey brought in by Jean and Pablo to ride Wildfire in The Sandpiper Classic, a major race. A very sweet, flirty girl, no one but Pablo suspected that she was bad news until she accepted an offer from Ken to ride Avatar, one of his best horses against Wildfire. She also had a fling with Matt at the end of season one and indicated that she had a fling with Pablo in the past.
Gillian Parsons (Charlotte Salt) A wealthy heiress who came to Dani's rescue when she needed money to save Davis Farms while Ken was in jail. She also came in as the ex-girlfriend of Kerry Conelly and slept with him while she was dating Matt. She gave up control of Davis Farms in order to keep her affair secret. However, Gillian comes clean after Matt has an affair with Kris and breaks up with Gillian. She then has a brief almost-fling with Junior before she goes back to England.
Kerry Connelly (Kieren Hutchison) A sports agent who signed on to represent Kris as her career started to take off. He did not mention his long-distance relationship with Gillian until after she walked in on him making out with Kris at the Davis charity ball and then proceeded to sleep with Gillian in order to get Kris a spot in the Breeders Invitational.
Todd Ritter (Andrew Hoeft) The quirky, wise-beyond-his-years son of Jean, and Matt's younger brother. He is in junior high and lives at Raintree Farm for the first three seasons and then goes away to boarding school.
Sheik Omar Al Sayed (Maurizio Rasti) He and his brother are very powerful players in the racing world. He purchases the best horses to race. He originally came to Raintree to see if Wildfire qualified to race in the Gold Cup, then returned wanting to purchase Wildfire. Later on, he came back to town to host the Bristol Stakes and had a brief flirtation with Dani. She did not reciprocate the feelings because she was still hung up on RJ. He then proceeded to organize an illegal match race between Raintree and Davis Farms with a purse of two million dollars, with some of his investors. He is not heard from again after the season three finale.
RJ Blake (Eric Winter) : A bull rider who became friends with Junior after he sees a kindred passion for riding bulls. He also starts a flirtation with his sister, Dani, and later ends up falling in love with her. He is killed in the episode "Heartless" and fans were devastated.

Guest cast and characters

Episodes

Home releases
Lionsgate Home Entertainment has released all four seasons on DVD in Region 1. Seasons 1-3 have been released on DVD from Lionsgate. Season 4 has not been officially released by Lionsgate. The 4th season is available from Amazon on DVD-R manufactured from their Prime Videos. From the Amazon listing for season four on DVD: When sold by Amazon.com, this product will be manufactured on demand using DVD-R recordable media. Amazon.com's standard return policy will apply.

References

2000s American teen drama television series
2005 American television series debuts
2008 American television series endings
ABC Family original programming
Television shows set in New Mexico
Television series by Lionsgate Television
Television shows filmed in New Mexico
Television shows set in California
Television series about families
Television series about horses
Television series created by Michael Piller